Jeremiah Murphy (fl. 1811 – 1815) was an Irish piper.

A native of Loughrea, County Galway, Murphy announced his relocation to Dublin in an edition of The Freeman's Journal, dated September 1811:

  
"THE IRISH PIPES. Jeremiah Murphy, late of Loughrea, begs leave to acquaint the lovers of national music that he at present plays at Darcy's Tavern, Cook Street, where he humbly hopes his exertions to please will obtain for him that encouragement with which he has for so many years been honored by the gentlemen of Munster and Connacht."  

Early in 1813, Murphy transferred to the Griffin Tavern, on Dame Street, described as "a sort of “Free-and-Easy” establishment." He ceased performing in taverns in 1815, and what became of him afterwards is unknown.

External links

 http://billhaneman.ie/IMM/IMM-XIX.html

References

 Famous performers on the Irish or Union pipes in the eighteenth and early part of the nineteenth centuries, chapter XIX, Irish Minstrels and Musicians, Capt. Francis O'Neill, Chicago, Regan Printing House, 1913.

18th-century Irish musicians
19th-century Irish musicians
Musicians from County Galway
Musicians from County Dublin
Irish uilleann pipers
People from Loughrea
Year of birth missing
Year of death missing